Secret Sinners may refer to:
 Secret Sinners (1926 film), a German silent film
 Secret Sinners (1933 film), an American drama film